The 2017 Sparks Energy 300 was the ninth stock car race of the 2017 NASCAR Xfinity Series season and the 26th iteration of the event. The race was held on Saturday, May 6, 2017, in Lincoln, Alabama at Talladega Superspeedway, a 2.66 miles (4.28 km) permanent triangle-shaped superspeedway. The race took the scheduled 113 laps to complete. At race's end, Aric Almirola, driving for Biagi-DenBeste Racing, would take the lead with four to go and defend fiercely to win his third and to date, final career NASCAR Xfinity Series win and his only win of the season. To fill out the podium, Elliott Sadler of JR Motorsports and Joey Logano of Team Penske would finish second and third, respectively.

Background 

Talladega Superspeedway, originally known as Alabama International Motor Superspeedway (AIMS), is a motorsports complex located north of Talladega, Alabama. It is located on the former Anniston Air Force Base in the small city of Lincoln. The track is a tri-oval and was constructed in the 1960s by the International Speedway Corporation, a business controlled by the France family. Talladega is most known for its steep banking and the unique location of the start/finish line that's located just past the exit to pit road. The track currently hosts the NASCAR series such as the NASCAR Cup Series, Xfinity Series and the Camping World Truck Series. Talladega is the longest NASCAR oval with a length of 2.66-mile-long (4.28 km) tri-oval like the Daytona International Speedway, which also is a 2.5-mile-long (4 km) tri-oval.

Entry list 

 (R) denotes rookie driver.
 (i) denotes driver who is ineligible for series driver points.

Practice

First practice 
The first practice session was held on Friday, May 5, at 10:30 AM CST, and would last for 55 minutes.

Second and final practice 
The second and final practice session, sometimes referred to as Happy Hour, was held on Friday, May 5, at 12:30 PM CST, and would last for 55 minutes.

Qualifying 
Qualifying was held on Saturday, May 6, at 9:30 AM CST. Since Talladega Superspeedway at least  in length, the qualifying system was a single car, single lap, two round system where in the first round, everyone would set a time to determine positions 13-40. Then, the fastest 12 qualifiers would move on to the second round to determine positions 1-12.

B. J. McLeod was the only driver to fail to qualify.

Full qualifying results

Race results 
Stage 1 Laps: 25

Stage 2 Laps: 25

Stage 3 Laps: 63

Standings after the race 

Drivers' Championship standings

Note: Only the first 12 positions are included for the driver standings.

References 

2017 NASCAR Xfinity Series
NASCAR races at Talladega Superspeedway
May 2017 sports events in the United States
2017 in sports in Alabama